The List of Adrian Messenger is a 1963 American mystery film directed by John Huston starring Kirk Douglas, George C. Scott, Dana Wynter, Clive Brook, Gladys Cooper and Herbert Marshall. It is based on a 1959 novel of the same name written by Philip MacDonald.

Plot
A writer named Adrian Messenger believes a series of apparently unrelated "accidental" deaths are actually linked murders. He asks his friend Anthony Gethryn, recently retired from MI5, to help clear up the mystery, and provides him with a list of the victims' names. Soon afterward, Messenger's plane is bombed while he is en route to collect evidence to confirm his suspicions and, with his dying breath, he tells a fellow passenger the key to the mystery.

The passenger survives and turns out to be Raoul Le Borg, Gethryn's old World War II counterpart in the French Resistance. The two of them join forces to investigate Messenger's list of names and decode his cryptic final words. They are joined by Lady Jocelyn Bruttenholm, Messenger’s cousin and a former love interest of Gethryn, who Raoul is strongly attracted to.

The first conclusion Gethryn and Le Borg draw from Messenger’s words is that there is important information in the manuscript of his unpublished book. Unfortunately, the murderer has beaten them there; he has taken several pages and re-typed them, removing certain information, and murdered the typist to conceal the error (encountering Jocelyn on his way out). After inspecting the manuscript, Gethryn spots the error, but he is powerless to undo it, and arrives too late to save the typist. From Jocelyn’s brief encounter with the murderer, Gethryn determines that he wears realistic masks to disguise his appearance.

Next, Gethryn and Le Borg visit the only living name on the list, James Slattery. When they arrive, they are told by James' invalid twin brother, Joe Slattery, that James died of a heart attack several years earlier. The two of them leave in disappointment, assuming all names on the list have died. That night, however, Joe sees and recognizes the masked murderer, who pursues him, knocks him out and pushes him into the ocean with his wheelchair, drowning him. The following day, his mother reveals the truth to Gethryn; “Joe” was actually James, who impersonated his deceased brother to collect his disability pension.

From James' mother, and from the widow of another name of the list, Gethryn and Le Borg establish that all on the list were together in a prisoner-of-war camp camp in Burma, where a Canadian sergeant betrayed his fellow prisoners, foiling their escape attempt. It stands to reason that the Canadian is the murderer, and killed each of the names on the list to prevent them from identifying him. They deduce that he is about to come into prominence and cannot risk being recognized. Almost by accident, Messenger’s final clue falls into place; it is revealed that the Canadian stands in line to an inheritance of the Bruttenholms, (pronounced "Brooms") Jocelyn’s family of landed gentry, who avidly engage in fox hunting.

Having disposed of all possible witnesses to his wartime treachery, the Canadian, George Brougham (pronounced 'Broom'), appears at a Bruttenholm estate fox hunt and introduces himself as a member of the family (he has previously been seen only in disguise). It then becomes clear to the visiting Gethryn and Le Borg that Brougham's next victim is to be the young heir, Derek, who comes before Brougham in inheritance. In an attempt to divert Brougham, Gethryn informs him of his investigation of Messenger’s list, calculating to set himself up as the next victim.

That night, Brougham sabotages the next morning’s hunt by laying a drag with a fox in a sack over the fields. He especially marks a blind spot behind a high wall, and moves a large hay tedder behind, intending for Gethryn (who has been given the honor of leading the hunt) to be impaled upon its lethal tines. Unbeknownst to Brougham, his plan goes awry when a farmer repositions the tedder early the next morning. The hunt begins, but comes to a halt at the specified spot. Gethryn reveals to the gathered crowd that he discovered and removed the hay-tedder booby trap earlier that morning and, with the help of the lead fox hound, will detect the scent of the culprit amongst a group of hunt saboteurs. Brougham, once again disguised, is identified and runs off, mounting Derek's horse.  When Derek shouts a command to the horse, the animal stops short, throwing Brougham and impaling him on the very same machine he intended for Gethryn.

Cast
 George C. Scott as Anthony Gethryn
 John Merivale as Adrian Messenger 
 Jacques Roux as Raoul Le Borg 
 Clive Brook as Marquis of Gleneyre
 Dana Wynter as Lady Jocelyn Bruttenholm
 Tony Huston as Derek Bruttenholm (credited as Walter Anthony Huston)
 Kirk Douglas as George Brougham / Mr. Pythian
 Gladys Cooper as Mrs. Karoudjian
 Herbert Marshall as Sir Willfrid Lucas
 Marcel Dalio as Max Karoudjian
 Bernard Archard as Insp. Pike
 Ronald Long as Carstairs (credited as Roland Long)
 Bernard Fox (actor) as Lynch (uncredited)
 John Roberts Running boy (uncredited)

Cameo appearances:
 Tony Curtis as street organ player
 Robert Mitchum as Slattery
 Frank Sinatra in cameo (Avatar's trainer) 
 Burt Lancaster in cameo (unnamed lady protesting against fox hunting)

Director John Huston also gives an uncredited cameo near the film's end, as Lord Ashton.

Commentary
The List of Adrian Messenger is a relatively modern Golden Age type of mystery with an additional gimmick that was featured prominently in its advertising. A number of famous Hollywood actors were advertised to appear in the film heavily disguised in make-up designed by John Chambers: Tony Curtis, Kirk Douglas, Burt Lancaster, Frank Sinatra, and Robert Mitchum. During an epilogue the stars appear on-camera removing their disguises and revealing their identity. Curtis is revealed to have portrayed a street organ player; Lancaster removes the disguise of a female fox-hunt protester; Sinatra doffs the make-up of a gypsy horse-trader; Mitchum removes his disguise as the victim Slattery; and Douglas sheds one of his make-ups at the close of a montage of several of the killer’s personas.

In actuality, only Curtis, Mitchum, and Douglas performed in the body of the film.  Lancaster and Sinatra only appear during the unmasking coda; their parts were portrayed by uncredited performers. Similarly, several of Douglas’ character’s disguised personas were performed instead by character actor Jan Merlin, who was hired in secret and labored with the Universal make-up artists for nearly a year before shooting began, under sometimes painful conditions and with no attribution. Merlin later incorporated his experiences working on this production into a thriller novel, Shooting Montezuma.

Production
There were several screenplay drafts, one by Vertigo co-writer Alec Coppel, before the final draft by Anthony Veiller, who receives sole screen credit.
Elizabeth Taylor was scheduled to be one of the guest stars hidden under make-up in a disguised role. She demurred after word was conveyed to her about the grueling process that applying and removing the disguise would involve.

Accolades
The film is recognized by American Film Institute in these lists:
 2008: AFI's 10 Top 10:
 Nominated Mystery Film

Home media
The List of Adrian Messenger was released on Region 1 DVD by Universal in 2009 as part of their print-on-demand "Vault Series." It was later included in Universal's 2016 DVD box-set Kirk Douglas: The Centennial Collection. It is also available on an Australian PAL DVD distributed by Umbrella Entertainment. An original soundtrack recording of the Jerry Goldsmith score was released in 2014 by Varèse Sarabande.

In popular culture
Beyond Our Ken played on the title of "Messenger" in its ‘film worth remembering, which is more than can he said for the next half hour’ at the start of the fourth programme in the seventh series, first broadcast on 15 December 1963.
Get Smart featured a 1970 parody of this movie called The Mess of Adrian Listenger starring Pat Paulsen in which secret agents named on a list are methodically eliminated. The episode title itself is an anagram of the movie title.
The plot of The Internecine Project is a variation on that of Messenger. A man about to be promoted to government advisor must clear his history of how he got there.
The plot of Red is also a variation on that of Messenger. A man coming into prominence plots to bump off old associates.
The plot of the Sidney Lumet film Q&A similarly turns on a rising politician who uses a corrupt cop to eliminate people who knew him in his days as a street gang leader and killer.

References

External links

1963 films
1960s mystery films
Bryna Productions films
Films based on British novels
Films based on mystery novels
Films directed by John Huston
1960s English-language films
Films scored by Jerry Goldsmith
American serial killer films
Universal Pictures films
1960s American films